"The Road to Hell" is a two-part song written by British singer-songwriter Chris Rea and released on the album of the same name. It was released as a single, with only part 2 on the A-side of the 7-inch. The single is Rea's biggest success in the United Kingdom, peaking at number 10 on the UK Singles Chart. The song was inspired by the frustrations of M25 and M4 motorway rush-hour traffic.

Track listings
7-inch single
Magnet YZ431

12-inch single
Magnet YZ431T

CD single
Magnet YZ431CD (3-inch) and YZ431CDP (5-inch)

CD single (US promo)
Geffen PRO-CD-3874

Cassette single
Magnet YZ431C

Charts

References

1989 songs
1989 singles
Chris Rea songs
M25 motorway
Magnet Records singles
Songs written by Chris Rea